Several fossiliferous stratigraphic units in Madagascar have provided fossils, most notably the Maastrichtian Maevarano Formation and the Jurassic Isalo III Formation. The oldest fossil-bearing formations date to ages before the break-up of Madagascar from Africa and India; the units of the Sakoa Group are found in both India and Madagascar, while the Beaufort Group is shared with southern Africa.



See also 
 Lists of fossiliferous stratigraphic units in Africa
 List of fossiliferous stratigraphic units in Mozambique
 List of fossiliferous stratigraphic units in Seychelles
 List of fossiliferous stratigraphic units in South Africa
 Geology of Madagascar

References

Further reading 
 O. Appert. 1977. Die Glossopteris flora der Sakoa in Sudwest-Madagaskar. Palaeontographica Abteilung B 162:1-50
 
 L. R. Cox. 1936. Karroo Lamellibranchia from Tanganyika Territory and Madagascar. Quarterly Journal of the Geological Society of London 92(365):32-56
 A. A. Farke and J. J. W. Sertich. 2013. An abelisauroid theropod dinosaur from the Turonian of Madagascar. PLoS ONE 8(4):e62047
 M. D. Gottfried, R. R. Rogers, and K. A. Curry Rogers. 2004. First record of Late Cretaceous coelacanths from Madagascar. Recent Advances in the Origin and Early Radiation of Vertebrates, in G. Arratia, M. V. H. Wilson, and R. Cloutier (eds.), Verlag Dr. Friedrich Pfeil, München 687-691
 M. D. Gottfried, J. A. Rabarison, and L. L. Randriamiarimanana. 2001. Late Cretaceous elasmobranchs from the Mahajanga Basin of Madagascar. Cretaceous Research 22:491-496
 N. J. Mateer, P. Wycisk, L. L. Jacobs, M. Brunet, P. Luger, M. A. Arush, F. Hendriks, T. WEissbrod, G. Gvirtzman, E. Mbede, A. Dina, R. T. J. Moody, G. Weigelt, H. A. El-Nakhal, J. Hell and J. Stets. 1992. Correlation of nonmarine Cretaceous strata of Africa and the Middle East. Cretaceous Research 13:273-318
 J. M. Mazin and G. M. King. 1991. The first dicynodont from the Late Permian of Malagasy. Palaeontology 34(4):837-842
 R. Paulian. 1965. Découverte d’une faune entomologique permienne à Madagascar. Comptes Rendus de l'Académie des Sciences de Paris 260:4028-4030
 C. Dal Sasso and G. Pasini. 2003. First record of pterosaurs (Diapsida, Archosauromorpha, Pterosauria) in the Middle Jurassic of Madagascar. Atti della Societa Italiana di Scienze Naturali e del Museo Civico di Storia Naturale in Milano 144:281-296
 
 
 E. I. White. 1932. On a new Triassic fish from North-east Madagascar. Journal of Natural History 10:80-83

Madagascar
 
 
Fossiliferous stratigraphic units
Fossil